John McGill (November 4, 1809 – January 14, 1872) was an American prelate of the Roman Catholic Church. He served as bishop of the Diocese of Richmond in Virginia from 1850 until his death in 1872.

Biography

Early life 
The oldest of ten children, John McGill was born on November 4, 1809, in Philadelphia, Pennsylvania, to James and Lavinia (née Dougherty) McGill, immigrants from County Donegal, Ireland. Following the birth of their sixth child, his parents moved the family to Bardstown, Kentucky, in 1819. At age 11, McGill entered St. Joseph's College, where he studied the classics.  In 1824, wanting to go into the priesthood, he went to St. Thomas' Seminary in Bardstown.  However, he dropped out after two years to study law under future Kentucky Governor Charles A. Wickliffe in Bardstown 

After getting his law license, McGill moved to New Orleans to practice law.  Six months later, he returned to Kentucky to work with newly elected U.S Representative Thomas Chilton. Despite his great financial success as a lawyer, McGill decided to resume his preparation for the priesthood by entering St. Mary's Seminary in Baltimore, Maryland.

Priesthood 
McGill was ordained to the priesthood for the Diocese of Bardstown by Bishop John David on June 13, 1835. After his ordination, McGill served as an assistant priest at St. Peter's Parish in Lexington, Kentucky, and at the Assumption Cathedral Parish in Louisville. In 1838, Coadjutor Bishop Guy Ignatius Chabrat sent McGill to Europe to accompany the frail Bishop Benedict Flaget back to Kentucky.  This gave McGill a chance to see Rome and recuperate from his own illness.

In 1839,  McGill was appointed editor of the Catholic Advocate, which he used to attack Protestantism.  He engaged in a written dispute with an Episcopalian minister about the history of the Church of England.  McGill also traded opinions with five other Protestant ministers in the local papers. McGill later became an assistant to Ignatius A. Reynolds, then vicar general of the diocese.  McGill was named as pastor of St. Louis' Parish in Louisville.

Bishop of Richmond 
On July 23, 1850, Pope Pius IX divided the Diocese of Richmond into two small dioceses, Richmond and Wheeling, and appointed McGill as the third bishop of Richmond. He received his episcopal consecration on November 10, 1850, in Bardstown from Archbishop Peter Kenrick, with Bishops Richard Miles and Martin Spalding serving as co-consecrators. 

When McGill arrived in Richmond in December 1850, the diocese had 7,000 Catholics, eight priests, and 10 churches. He went to Rome in 1854 to be present at the definition of the Immaculate Conception, and convened the first diocesan synod in 1855. During his tenure, Virginia was devastated by yellow fever and cholera epidemics.

During the American Civil War, Catholics in the South were unable to purchase Catholic books published in the North.  To fill the gap, McGill wrote, "The True Church Indicated to the Inquirer" and "Our Faith, the Victory", republished as "The Creed of Catholics". He also visited Union Army prisoners of war in the Libby Prison in Richmond, doing what he could to aid them.  In 1867, McGill brought the Sisters of Charity from Emmitburgh, Maryland, to set up a school in the diocese.  According to his contemporaries, McGill was a very kind person, good with children and supportive of his priests.  An accomplished speaker, McGill addressed congregations in Cincinnati, Charleston, Louisville, and Baltimore, as well as in Paris and Rome.

McGill attended the First Vatican Council in Rome from 1869 to 1870, where he supported papal infallibility.  While in Rome, he suddenly lost vision in one eye and started experiencing other symptoms. By the time he returned to Richmond, his health had worsened.

John McGill died of stomach cancer on January 14, 1872, at Richmond, aged 62.

References

Episcopal succession

1809 births
1872 deaths
19th-century Roman Catholic bishops in the United States
American people of Irish descent
Catholic Church in Kentucky
Clergy from Philadelphia
Religious leaders from Kentucky
Roman Catholic bishops of Richmond
St. Mary's Seminary and University alumni